Pedilus lugubris is a species of fire-colored beetle in the family Pyrochroidae. It is found in North America.

References

Further reading

External links

Pyrochroidae
Articles created by Qbugbot